The 1980–81 season of the European Cup Winners' Cup was won by Dinamo Tbilisi in the final against Carl Zeiss Jena. Dinamo Tbilisi's side defeated English Second Division side West Ham United away before beating Carl Zeiss Jena in a final watched by 4,750 people in Düsseldorf. This win was the high point of the Georgian side and is still the club's greatest achievement. 

The competition included the Real Madrid reserve team, Castilla CF, who qualified as the runners-up of the 1979–80 Copa del Rey.

Preliminary round

|}

First leg

Second leg

Celtic won 7–2 on aggregate.

Benfica won 4–0 on aggregate.

First round

|}

First leg

Second leg

2–2 on aggregate; Politehnica Timișoara won on away goals.

Carl Zeiss Jena won 4–3 on aggregate.

Second round

|}

First leg

Second leg

Newport County won 6–0 on aggregate.

West Ham United won 4–1 on aggregate.

Carl Zeiss Jena won 3–2 on aggregate.

Benfica won 2–1 on aggregate.

Quarter-finals

|}

First leg

Second leg

Dinamo Tbilisi won 4–2 on aggregate.

Feyenoord won 6–3 on aggregate.

Carl Zeiss Jena won 3–2 on aggregate.

Benfica won 3–2 on aggregate.

Semi-finals

|}

First leg

Second leg

Dinamo Tbilisi won 3–2 on aggregate.

Carl Zeiss Jena won 2–1 on aggregate.

Final

See also
1980–81 European Cup
1980–81 UEFA Cup

References

External links
 1980–81 competition at UEFA website
 Cup Winners' Cup results at Rec.Sport.Soccer Statistics Foundation
 Cup Winners Cup Seasons 1980-81–results, protocols
 website Football Archive 1980–81 Cup Winners Cup

3
UEFA Cup Winners' Cup seasons